Metro FM is a national radio station in South Africa.

Metro FM may also refer to:

 Metro FM (Ghana), a radio station in Kumasi, Ashanti Region
 Metro FM (Nepal), a radio station in Kathmandu
 Metro FM (Turkey), a radio station in Istanbul